The Jewish Coaches Association (JCA) is a non-profit organization founded in 2005 that supports Jewish-American college, high school, and youth basketball coaches around the United States. The association is an advocacy group for coaches to represent coaches to the NCAA and National Association of Basketball Coaches. Founding members include Bobby Schwartz, founding national director; and Bruce Pearl, who served as the first president of the association.

Annual events and awards
The JCA holds an annual breakfast for Jewish coaches at the Final Four and sometimes offers Shabbat services for coaches and their families during the Final Four weekend of events. When Passover occurs during the Final Four, the JCA can help to organize seders for coaches and their families. The Red Auerbach award recognizes the most outstanding Jewish-American basketball coach of the year. The Association takes nominations from its members and in March at the conclusion of conference tournament play the Board of Directors vote to determine a winner. The winner is presented the Red Auerbach Trophy at the Final Four.

Programs 
The JCA provides a number of programs during the year in order to better service and promote its members. These programs include:

 Basketball Clinics and Workshops – Clinics and workshops are provided for the members to help them in their development as basketball coaches as part of its Partnership in coaching.
 Basketball Camps – The JCA looks to secure employment at college basketball camps around the country for its members.
 Networking – The JCA promotes its members careers and help them make contacts toward coaching opportunities
 Community Service – JCA member coaches work within their institutions to get their teams involved in their local communities and do charitable events and fundraisers. The organization recruits members to travel around the USA to speak and teach at Jewish camps around the nation.
 Maccabi Basketball Coaches – The JCA works with Maccabi USA and local Maccabi delegations to get JCA members involved and hired as Maccabi USA coaches and Maccabi delegation coaches. In 2009 both the JCA president and Vice-President served as coaches on the USA National Maccabi Basketball team representing our nation overseas in the World Maccabi games in Israel. Member coaches also help locate Jewish basketball players around the nation to try out for Maccabi USA teams.
 Breaking down barriers – The AJCA works to create fair hiring practices in basketball by working towards tolerance and understanding and cooperation with schools where coaches were denied interviews or not hired simply due to their faith and cultural background.
 Community of faith gatherings – The JCA organizes coaches from different backgrounds and religions for a unity breakfast and non-denominational prayer. The association works to inspire Jewish values in its member coaches to always work and coach with integrity and to serve as role models to their players and in their communities.
 Membership – The Jewish Coaches Association has a National Director and an Assistant National Director, which run the day-to-day operations. There is also a Board of Directors, which advises the National Director. The members elect a President and a Vice-President. There is an annual meeting held each year at the NABC Convention at the Final Four.

References 

Basketball organizations
+
+
Coaching associations based in the United States
+
Jewish sports organizations
Jewish community organizations
Sports charities
Charities based in New Jersey
2006 establishments in the United States
Sports organizations established in 2006